Darnhall is a civil parish in Cheshire West and Chester, England.  It contains eight buildings that are recorded in the National Heritage List for England as designated listed buildings, all of which are at Grade II.  This grade is the lowest of the three gradings given to listed buildings and is applied to "buildings of national importance and special interest".  The parish is entirely rural and this is reflected in the nature of the listed buildings, which consist of three farmhouses, a mill house, a mill, stables, and two bridges.

See also
Listed buildings in Winsford
Listed buildings in Little Budworth
Listed buildings in Church Minshull
Listed buildings in Stanthorne
Listed buildings in Wimboldsley

References
Citations

Sources

Listed buildings in Cheshire West and Chester
Lists of listed buildings in Cheshire